Joe Hughes is an English professional boxer who was born with Erb's palsy. He held the European light-welterweight title from 2018 to 2019 and challenged twice for the same title, along with two attempts at the British light-welterweight title between 2017 and 2019.

Early life
Joe Hughes was born on 6 August 1990 in Bath, Somerset, and grew up in Malmesbury, Wiltshire. He developed Erb's palsy after dislocating his shoulder during birth, a condition which causes paralysis due to damaged nerves. Due to the condition, his right arm failed to develop properly and is three inches shorter than his left. Doctors told his parents that he would never be able to run in a straight line, have a manual job or participate in contact sports.

His introduction to combat sports came through taekwondo around the age of five. His father took him to lessons as an alternative to physiotherapy for his shoulder, with Hughes stating in an interview with BBC Sports, "Since I was born I had to do physiotherapy on it and obviously when you're a child you don't want to do those standard exercises, it's boring for a child." He first got into boxing three years later after his father took him to the Malmesbury Amateur Boxing Club at the age of eight.

Professional career

Early career 
Hughes made his professional debut on 16 October 2010, scoring a six-round points decision (PTS) victory over Jason Carr at the Troxy in London. After three more wins, two by stoppage, he suffered the first defeat of his career against Joe Elfidh in March 2012, losing by PTS over six rounds.

Following defeat he secured four more wins, one by stoppage, before facing Kristian Dochev for the vacant International Masters light-welterweight title on 5 April 2014 at The Forum in Bath. Hughes captured his first professional title, defeating Dochev via PTS over ten rounds. In his next fight he defeated future Commonwealth light-welterweight champion, Philip Bowes, on 11 October 2014 at The O2 Arena in London, capturing the vacant Southern Arena light-welterweight title with a technical knockout (TKO) in the tenth and final round. In his next bout he fought for a regional IBO title, defeating Jaba Shalutashvili on 18 April 2015 at the Whitchurch Sports Centre in Bristol, capturing the vacant IBO International light-welterweight title via eighth-round TKO.

English title 
Following his win over Shalutashvili, Hughes was scheduled to face Ryan Taylor for the vacant English light-welterweight title. However, after Taylor suffered a stoppage defeat earlier in the month he was handed an automatic suspension, prompting Anthony Hardy to be drafted in as a replacement. The bout took place on 18 July 2015 at the Bath Pavilion in Bath, with Hughes emerging victorious via ten-round split decision (SD) to capture his fourth professional title in as many fights. Two judges scored the bout 98–92 in favour of Hughes while the third scored it 97–95 to Hardy. After a TKO win in a non-title fight against Tomas Bartunek in October, Hughes successfully defended his English title on 5 December, defeating Anthony Upton via ten-round unanimous decision (UD) at the Town Hall in Walsall.

After his win over Upton, Hughes relinquished his English title in favour of a final eliminator for the British light-welterweight title, challenging The Ring magazine's number nine ranked contender and WBO Inter-Continental light-welterweight champion Jack Catterall. The bout took place on 13 May 2016 at the Macron Stadium's Premier Suite in Bolton, with Hughes suffering the second defeat of his career, losing by UD with the judges' scorecards reading 117–112, 117–113, and 115–113.

Following the defeat to Catterall, Hughes was installed as the mandatory challenger for the English title that he relinquished prior to the Catterall fight, which was then held by former victim Anthony Upton. Upton elected to relinquish the title instead of fighting Hughes, leaving Hughes to face Andy Keates for the vacant title on 17 December 2016 at Action Indoor Sports in Bristol. Hughes regained the English title via UD, with the judges' scorecards reading 100–92, 98–94, and 97–94.

British title attempt 
For his next fight he once again vacated his English title in order to challenge British light-welterweight champion, Tyrone Nurse, on 23 April 2017 at the Leicester Arena. In what was viewed as a surprise result, Hughes fought to a twelve-round split draw. One judge scored the bout 115–113 in favour of Hughes, another scored it 116–113 for Nurse while the third judge scored it even at 115–115 to see Nurse retain the British title.

European title 
He returned to the Leicester Arena for his next fight, challenging European light-welterweight champion, Anthony Yigit, on 2 December. In a fight that saw Hughes start as the aggressor, he eventually slowed down as he began to tire, going on to suffer his third professional defeat with a UD loss. The judges' scorecards read 118–112, 118–110, and 119–109. After securing a stoppage victory by corner retirement (RTD) against Ruben Rodriguez in February 2018, Hughes was handed a second shot at the European title, this time against Andrea Scarpa for the vacant title on 30 November 2018 at the Teatro Obi Hall in Florence, Italy. Hughes captured his first major regional title via SD, with two judges scoring the bout 118–110 and 116–112 in favour of Hughes while the third judge scored it 116–112 to Scarpa.

He would make a second attempt at the British title in a unification fight against reigning champion Robbie Davies Jr. on 30 March 2019 at the Echo Arena in Liverpool. Hughes lost his European title by UD, with the judges' scorecards reading 115–114, 115–113, and 118–110.

Cancelled bout with Ritson 
He was scheduled to make his comeback on 2 August against former British lightweight champion and reigning WBA Continental light-welterweight champion Lewis Ritson at the Liverpool Exhibition Centre. However, in the week leading up to the fight Hughes was forced to withdraw after a back injury.

Third European title attempt 
After recovering from his back injury, Hughes got the chance to become a two-time European champion, challenging reigning champion Sandor Martin on 12 December 2019 at the Pabellón de la Vall d'Hebron in Barcelona, Spain. Hughes was unsuccessful in his attempt, losing by a wide UD margin with two judges' scoring the bout 119–108 and the third scoring it 117–111.

Professional boxing record

References

External links

Sportsmen with disabilities
English male boxers
Sportspeople from Bath, Somerset
Light-welterweight boxers
European Boxing Union champions
Living people
Date of birth missing (living people)
Year of birth missing (living people)